Kuruçay can refer to:

 Kuruçay, Bayat
 Kuruçay, Burdur
 Kuruçay, Çorum
 Kuruçay, Çubuk
 Kuruçay, İliç
 Kuruçay, Vezirköprü